THQ Nordic is an Austrian video game publisher that acts as the subsidiary of Swedish holding company Embracer Group. Established in 2011 as Nordic Games, the company had acquired the "THQ" trademark in 2014 and changed its name to THQ Nordic in 2016 to better reflect its portfolio. The company, as well as its parent and other entities acting on its behalf, have acquired other companies' games, which are now managed by THQ Nordic.

List

References 

Acquisitions
THQ Nordic